CSZ may refer to:
An abbreviation for "city, state, and ZIP code" in the United States.
ComedySportz, an improvisational comedy show
CSZ is the ICAO airline designator for  Shenzhen Airlines
Cascadia subduction zone